William Collier Sr. (November 12, 1864 – January 13, 1944), born William Morenus, was an American writer, director and actor.

Collier ran away from home when only 11 years old to join a touring company run by Eddie Foy and in 1879 he appeared as a juvenile in H.M.S. Pinafore. After a notable stage career, he tried motion pictures, under producer Mack Sennett. He then went back to the stage for some years but returned to films when the talkies came along.

In 1910 he appeared at the Elitch Theatre in Denver, Colorado, while his adopted son, stage named William Collier Jr., was recovering from scarlet fever that was followed by typhoid. His son recovered and was able to join his father in a production of The Patriot.

He "once opened The Patriot, one of his own plays, on December 30.  On January 2 he advertised with some degree of truthfulness: 'Second Year in New York.'"

He was married to the actress Louise Allen; she died in 1909 and he married Paula Marr the following year, adopting her son Charles, whom he renamed William Collier Jr. 

Collier died of pneumonia in 1944. He was interred at the Forest Lawn Memorial Park in Glendale, California.

Partial filmography

 Never Again (1916, Short)
 Better Late Than Never (1916, Short) - The Art Student
 The No-Good Guy (1916) - Jimmy Coghlan
 The Servant Question (1920) - Mr. Butler
 Happy Days (1929) - End Man - Minstrel Show
 Harmony at Home (1930) - Joe Haller
 Free and Easy (1930) - Himself - Master of Ceremonies at Premiere
 High Society Blues (1930) - Horace Divine
 She's My Weakness (1930) - David Tuttle
 Up the River (1930) - Pop
 Seas Beneath (1931) - Mugs O'Flaherty (uncredited)
 Mr. Lemon of Orange (1931) - Mr. Blake
 6 Cylinder Love (1931) - Richard Burton
 Annabelle's Affairs (1931) - Wickham
 The Brat (1931) - Judge Emmett A. O'Flaherty
 Stepping Sisters (1932) - Herbert Ramsey
 After Tomorrow (1932) - Willie Taylor
 The Washington Masquerade (1932) - Babcock
 Hot Saturday (1932) - Mr. Brock
 Madison Square Garden (1932) - Doc Williams
 All of Me (1934) - Jerry Helman
 The Crosby Case (1934) - The Detective-Police Sgt. Melody
 Cheaters (1934) - K.C. Kelly
 A Successful Failure (1934) - Ellery Cushing aka Uncle Dudley
 The Murder Man (1935) - 'Pop' Grey
 Annapolis Farewell (1935) - Rumboat Charlie
 The Bride Comes Home (1935) - Alfred Desmereau
 Love on a Bet (1936) - Uncle Carlton MacCreigh
 Give Us This Night (1936) - Priest
 Cain and Mabel (1936) - Pop Walters
 Valiant Is the Word for Carrie (1936) - Ed Moresby
 Josette (1938) - David Brassard Sr.
 Thanks for the Memory (1938) - Mr. Platt
 Say It in French (1938) - Howland
 Persons in Hiding (1939) - Burt Nast
 I'm from Missouri (1939) - Smith
 Invitation to Happiness (1939) - Mr. Wayne
 Television Spy (1939) - James Llewellyn
 Disputed Passage (1939) - Dr. William Cunningham
 Miracle on Main Street (1939) - Dr. Miles
 The Hard-Boiled Canary (1941) - Dr. Joseph E. Maddy (final film role)

References

External links

1864 births
1944 deaths
American film directors
American male screenwriters
American male film actors
20th-century American male actors
Burials at Forest Lawn Memorial Park (Glendale)
Deaths from pneumonia in California
20th-century American male writers
20th-century American screenwriters